Jessica Hausner (born 6 October 1972) is an Austrian film director and screenwriter. She received international attention in 2001 when her film Lovely Rita, a portrait of a young girl who feels confined by family constraints, was screened in the Un Certain Regard section at the 2001 Cannes Film Festival. Three years later she returned to Cannes with her film Hotel. Her 2014 film Amour Fou was selected to compete in the Un Certain Regard section at the 2014 Cannes Film Festival.

Jessica Hausner is the daughter of Viennese painter Rudolf Hausner, sister of costume designer Tanja Hausner and half sister of set designer and painter Xenia Hausner. She studied at Filmacademy Vienna. With fellow directors Barbara Albert and Antonin Svoboda and director of photography Martin Gschlacht, she founded the Viennese film production company coop99 in 1999. She was appointed a member of the Academy of Motion Picture Arts and Sciences in 2017.

In 2002 she was a member of the jury at the 24th Moscow International Film Festival. In 2016, she was a member of the jury for the Un Certain Regard section of the 2016 Cannes Film Festival.

Filmography
 Flora (short film, 1995)
 Inter-View (1999)
 Lovely Rita (2001)
 Hotel (2004)
 Sleeper (2005 - producer; dir: Benjamin Heisenberg)
 Toast (2006)
Reclaim Your Brain (2007 - producer; dir: Hans Weingartner)
 Lourdes (2009)
 Amour Fou (2014)
 Little Joe (2019)

References

External links

1972 births
Living people
Austrian film directors
Austrian screenwriters
Austrian women film directors
Film people from Vienna
Austrian women screenwriters